Momotombo is a stratovolcano in Nicaragua, not far from the city of León. It stands on the shores of Lago de Managua. The ruins of this city are preserved at León Viejo (Old León). It also erupted in 1886, 1905, and most recently November 30, 2015.

The mountain is very symmetrical, and its form is a symbol of Nicaragua, cropping up in locations from matchboxes to revolutionary murals.  This volcano was also very popular before World War I began.  Many tourists visited, especially in 1904, one year before the eruption.  The Nicaraguan poet Rubén Darío wrote the poem "Momotombo". in its honor

A major geothermal field is located on the southern flank of the volcano.  To climb the mountain, with a permit cross through the geothermal power plant and follow an easily marked trail through the treeline.  Due to the active nature of the volcano and landslides, the route from the treeline to the top is constantly changing.  The quickest way is straight up, through the small avalanche paths.

It has a younger cone: , which is inside Lake Managua.

See also
 List of volcanoes in Nicaragua

References

External links 
 Climbing the Momotombo Volcano
 Momotombo on stamps
 Images of Momotombo

Stratovolcanoes of Nicaragua
Active volcanoes
Mountains of Nicaragua
León Department
Holocene stratovolcanoes